Chionanthus callophyllus grows as a tree up to  tall, with a trunk diameter of up to . The bark is white, grey or brown. The flowers are pale green or white. The specific epithet callophyllus is from the Greek meaning "beautiful leaf". Habitat is lowland forest, sometimes in swamps, from sea-level to  altitude. C. callophyllus is found in Thailand, Malaysia and Indonesia (Borneo and Sumatra).

References

callophyllus
Plants described in 1851
Trees of Thailand
Trees of Malaya
Trees of Borneo
Trees of Sumatra